This is a list of electoral results for the Electoral district of Dianella in Western Australian state elections.

Members for Dianella

Election results

Elections in the 1990s

Elections in the 1980s

Elections in the 1970s

References

Western Australian state electoral results by district